Harry Butler (William Henry Butler, 1930–2015) was an Australian naturalist and environmental consultant.

Harry Butler may also refer to:
Harry Butler (aviator) (Henry John Butler, 1889–1922), Australian aviation pioneer and WWI flying ace
Harry Butler (rugby league) (1887–1965), Australian rugby league footballer in 1908 NSWRFL season

See also
Lionel Harry Butler (1923–1981), UK academic, Principal of Royal Holloway College, University of London
Henry Butler (disambiguation)
Harold Butler (disambiguation)